Husiná is a village and municipality in the Rimavská Sobota District of the Banská Bystrica Region of southern Slovakia.

History
In historical records, the village was first mentioned in 1332 (Guibna) as a village along with a parish. In the second half of 14th century it passed to Ratold noble family, and in the 15th century to the Perényi landowners as a part of the Filakovo town.

Genealogical resources

The records for genealogical research are available at the state archive "Statny Archiv in Banska Bystrica,

Slovakia"

 Roman Catholic church records (births/marriages/deaths): 1774-1873 (parish A)
 Lutheran church records (births/marriages/deaths): 1767-1883 (parish B)

See also
 List of municipalities and towns in Slovakia

External links
https://web.archive.org/web/20070513023228/http://www.statistics.sk/mosmis/eng/run.html
http://svinica.ou.sk/husina-guszona-o33-uvod.html
http://www.stonline.sk/husinaou
Surnames of living people in Husina

Villages and municipalities in Rimavská Sobota District